William John Moffatt (30 June 1897 – 17 October 1952) was a Scottish professional footballer who played as a wing half or full back in the Scottish League for Bo'ness and in the English Football League for Portsmouth and Brighton & Hove Albion.

Life and career
Moffatt was born in Bellshill, Lanarkshire, in 1897. He played junior football for Bellshill Athletic before joining Bo'ness of Division Two. He captained the team to the quarter-finals of the 1922–23 Scottish Cup, in which they performed well in a 4–2 defeat to Division One club Motherwell despite being handicapped by an injury to Moffatt.

In 1925, he signed for English Second Division club Portsmouth. He soon established himself in the team, and was ever-present in the 1926–27 season in which they were promoted to the First Division. He took his appearance total to 138 before being released in 1930 to join Brighton & Hove Albion of the Third Division South. He was already 32 years old, and Albion used him as a standby player to cover at right back and wing half. In his first season, he contributed to a run of 16 league matches unbeaten that remained a club record until 2015. After two seasons and 23 appearances, he left the Football League for non-league football in the Hampshire area.

Moffatt died in Southsea, Hampshire, in 1952 at the age of 55.

References

1897 births
1952 deaths
Footballers from Bellshill
Scottish footballers
Association football wing halves
Association football fullbacks
Bellshill Athletic F.C. players
Bo'ness F.C. players
Portsmouth F.C. players
Brighton & Hove Albion F.C. players
Scottish Junior Football Association players
Scottish Football League players
English Football League players